Javelin Kajireh Guidry (born August 6, 1998) is an American football cornerback for the Atlanta Falcons of the National Football League (NFL). He played college football at Utah.

Professional career
Guidry ran a 4.29-second 40-yard dash at the 2020 NFL Scouting Combine.

New York Jets
Guidry was signed by the New York Jets as an undrafted free agent following the 2020 NFL Draft on May 6, 2020. He was waived during final roster cuts on September 5, 2020, and signed to the team's practice squad the next day. He was promoted to the active roster on October 1, 2020, and made his NFL debut in the Jets' week 4 loss to the Denver Broncos that day.

On August 30, 2022, Guidry was waived by the Jets.

Arizona Cardinals
On August 31, 2022, Guidry was claimed off waivers by the Arizona Cardinals. He was waived on September 10, 2022.

Las Vegas Raiders
On September 12, 2022, Guidry was claimed off waivers by the Las Vegas Raiders. He was waived on September 21 and signed to the practice squad two days after. On October 25, 2022, Guidry was released from the practice squad.

Philadelphia Eagles
On October 31, 2022, the Philadelphia Eagles signed Guidry to their practice squad. Guidry was released on December 6, 2022.

Atlanta Falcons
On December 8, 2022, Guidry was signed to the Atlanta Falcons' practice squad. He signed a reserve/future contract on January 9, 2023.

References

External links
New York Jets bio
Utah Utes bio

1998 births
Living people
People from Murrieta, California
Players of American football from California
Sportspeople from Riverside County, California
American football cornerbacks
Utah Utes football players
New York Jets players
Arizona Cardinals players
Las Vegas Raiders players
Philadelphia Eagles players
Atlanta Falcons players